Clarence Scott (May 5, 1944 - May 17, 2019) was an American football defensive back.

Scott was born in Norristown, Pennsylvania, in 1944. He attended Upper Merion High School in King of Prussia, Pennsylvania, and played college football at Morgan State.

He first played professional in the Continental Football League for the Philadelphia Bulldogs in 1966. He later played in the American Football League (AFL) and National Football League (NFL) for the Boston Patriots (1969-1970) and New England Patriots (1971-1972). He appeared in 43 games for the Patriots, 24 as a starter.

References

1944 births
2019 deaths
American football defensive backs
Morgan State Bears football players
New England Patriots players
Players of American football from Pennsylvania
People from Norristown, Pennsylvania
Boston Patriots players